Chris Kolker is an American politician and a Democratic member of the Colorado Senate who represents District 16. In the 2022 reapportionment process, his residence moved from senate district 27 to senate district 16, so he began to represent the 16th district in 2023. The district includes all or parts of Centennial, Littleton, Ken Caryl, Columbine and Columbine Valley in Arapahoe and Jefferson counties.

He was first elected to the Colorado State Senate in 2020 to District 27.

References

Democratic Party Colorado state senators
21st-century American politicians
Living people
Year of birth missing (living people)
Place of birth missing (living people)